Lismore RFC is a rugby union side based in Edinburgh, Scotland. They were founded in 1901.

History
Lismore's foundation dates back to 1901, when the Royal High School FP club was based at Jock's Lodge in the east of Edinburgh. Some of the players felt that they were being excluded from RHSFP's team, so started their own club, named after Lismore Crescent nearby. The club moved around several times, locating to Duddingston, and ending up in their present location in a south side clubhouse, and playing near Cameron Toll.

Milne's Bar on Rose Street, was their clubhouse around the Second World War period.

They started a women's side in 1994.

Lismore Sevens

The club run the Lismore Sevens tournament, featuring a men's and women's competition. The men play for the Rattery Cup.

Honours

Men

 Lismore Sevens
 Champions: (1) 1990
 Edinburgh Northern Sevens
 Champions: (5) 1980, 1981, 1983, 1986, 2010

Women

 Edinburgh Northern Sevens
 Champions: (1) 1999

References

Sources

 Massie, Allan A Portrait of Scottish Rugby (Polygon, Edinburgh)

External links
 Lismore RFC on pitchero.com
 Facebook site

Scottish rugby union teams
Rugby union in Edinburgh
Sports teams in Edinburgh